Snyder is an Anglicized occupational surname derived from Dutch Snijder "tailor" (alternatively spelled "Snyder" in the past, see "ij"/"y"), related to modern Dutch Snijders and Sneijder. It may also be an Anglicized spelling of the German Schneider or Swiss German Schnyder, which both carry the same meaning. A less common Anglicized spelling of the Dutch Snijder is Snider.

Notable people with the surname include:

Alan Snyder (disambiguation), multiple people
Allen Snyder (disambiguation), multiple people
Allan Snyder, Australian professor and researcher of the human brain
Allen Snyder (coach), American college sports coach
Alice D. Snyder (1887–1943), American educator
Bill Snyder (born 1939), the head football coach of Kansas State University
Blake Snyder (1957–2009), American screenwriter and writing mentor
Brandon Snyder (born 1986), American baseball player and coach
C. B. J. Snyder (1860–1945), American architect
Charles P. Snyder (politician) (1847–1915), West Virginia congressman
Christopher Snyder, medieval historian
Chris Snyder (born 1981), American baseball player
Chris Snyder (American football) (born 1974), American football player
Christopher Snyder (economist) (born 1967), American Economist
C. R. Snyder (Charles Richard "Rick" Snyder) (1944–2006), American psychologist
Dana Snyder (born 1973), American voice actor
Daniel Snyder (disambiguation), multiple people
Deborah Snyder, American film producer
Duke Snider (1926–2011), full name Edwin Donald Snider, former baseball player
Edward Snyder (1895–1982), American cameraman and cinematographer 
EJ Snyder (born 1965), American survivalist and television personality
Elizabeth Snyder, soap opera writer
Ellsworth Snyder (1931–2005), pianist and abstract artist
Frederic Beal Snyder (1859–1951), American lawyer and politician
Esther Snyder (1920–2006), the co-founder of In-N-Out Burger
Gary Snyder, poet, essayist, social and environmental activist
Gene Snyder, pitcher for the 1959 Dodgers
George Snyder, Kentucky blacksmith who invented the first American-made fishing reel
George Snyder (politician) (1929–2017), American politician
Glenn Snyder, scholar of international relations theory
Gordon Taylor Snyder, Canadian politician
Harry Snyder (1913–1976), the co-founder of In-N-Out Burger
Harry Snyder (scientist) (1867–1927), scientist
Henry N. Snyder (1865–1949), Methodist educator, author, and president of Wofford College
J. Buell Snyder (1877–1946), American politician of Pennsylvania
Jack Snyder, political scientist
James Snyder (disambiguation), multiple people
Jefferson B. Snyder (1859–1951), American politician of Louisiana
Jerome Snyder (1916–1976), American Artist
John Pillsbury Snyder (1888–1959), American businessman and politician
John Snyder (disambiguation), multiple people
Kerala J. Snyder (born 1936), American musicologist and classical organist
Kirk Snyder, former professional basketball player in the NBA
Kyle Snyder, Boston Red Sox pitcher
Laura J. Snyder (born 1964), American historian, philosopher, and writer
Leon C. Snyder (1908–1897), Horticulturist and co-founder of Minnesota Landscape Arboretum
Leroy Snyder (1931–2001), American serial killer
Liza Snyder (born 1968), American actress
Louis Leo Snyder, (1907–1993), American-born German scholar
Lucy A. Snyder, author
Luke Snyder (bull rider) (born 1982), American bull rider
Maria V. Snyder, American fantasy author
Michael James Snyder, American businessman
Mitch Snyder (1943–1990), advocate for the homeless
Nick Snyder (born 1995), American baseball player
Patrick Snyder, Wisconsin politician
Rick Snyder (born 1958), American businessman and politician, former Governor of Michigan
Robert H. Snyder, Louisiana politician
Ross S. Snyder, American recording engineer and inventor
Ruth Brown Snyder (1895–1928), American murderer
Scott Snyder, American comic book writer
Simon Snyder, the third Governor of Pennsylvania
Sid Snyder, American businessman and politician
Solomon H. Snyder, American neuroscientist
Tara Snyder (born in 1977), American tennis player
Ted Snyder (1881–1965), American lyricist and composer
Timothy Snyder, American historian
Tom Snyder, American television personality
Virgil Snyder (1869–1950), American mathematician
Zack Snyder, American filmmaker
Zilpha Keatley Snyder, American author

See also
Snider (surname)

References

Occupational surnames
German-language surnames
Dutch-language surnames